Matthew John Parker (born 1 June 1963, in Manchester) is a British bishop who has served as area Bishop of Stafford since 2021. He was previously Archdeacon of Stoke (i.e. the same area) since 2013.

Education
Parker was educated at The Bishop Wand Church of England School, the University of Manchester, Sidney Sussex College, Cambridge and Ridley Hall, Cambridge.

Ordained ministry
Parker was ordained in the Church of England as a deacon in 1988 and as a priest in 1989. He served as an assistant curate at St Mary's Church, Twickenham from 1988 to 1991, and at St George's Church, Heaviley from 1991 to 1994. He was then team vicar of the Stockport SW Team from 1993 to 2000, and team rector of the Leek and Meerbrook Team from 2000 to 2013.

On 24 September 2020, it was announced that he would be the next Bishop of Stafford in the Diocese of Lichfield. He was scheduled to be consecrated as bishop on 28 January 2021, and installed at Lichfield Cathedral on 7 February 2021, but these have been postponed and Parker licensed as Episcopal vicar for the Stafford episcopal area. He was consecrated a bishop on 14 April 2021, by Anthony Poggo, at Lambeth Palace, in the third of the three consecration services there that day.

References

1963 births
Clergy from Manchester
Living people
People educated at The Bishop Wand Church of England School
Alumni of the University of Manchester
Alumni of Sidney Sussex College, Cambridge
Alumni of Ridley Hall, Cambridge
Archdeacons of Stoke
Bishops of Stafford